Ras Akyem (sometimes called Ras Akyem Ramsey or Ras Akyem I Ramsey) is a Barbadian painter.  A graduate of the Edna Manley School of Art in Jamaica, his work is heavily influenced by the Rastafari movement and bears resemblance to the paintings of Jean-Michel Basquiat.  His work is frequently exhibited alongside that of Ras Ishi Butcher.

References
Biography
Art Collection Foundation. National Art Collection Exhibition. Bridgetown: ACF, 1985. 
“Setting Sails to New Horizons.” www.nationnews.com. Accessed June 16, 2018. 
Black Jacobins at the Caribbean Pavilion. Bridgetown, Barbados: National Art Gallery Committee, 2011. 
Caribbean Artists Today, 1994.
Cummins, Alissandra, Allison Thompson, and Nick Whittle. “Ras Akyem and Ras Ishi.” In Art in Barbados: What Type of Mirror Image?, 209–13, 235–36. Ian Randle Publishers,Jamaica, 1999.
“Diaspora-Now - Ras Akyem I Ramsey Bio.” Accessed June 16, 2018.
Gallery in Cork Street, and Barbados Investment and Development Corporation. Contemporary Art from Barbados. Bridgetown, Barbados: BIDC, 1997.
Hadchity, Therese. “Arts Ani-Mal RAS AKYEM-I RAMSAY : LIFETIME ACHIEVEMENT AWARD IN THE VISUAL ARTS 2010 and Retrospective Exhibition,” October 2010.
Hadchity, Therese. Words on Paintings: An Exhibition of Art and Writing, Collectively Curated by Writers, Artists, Collectors and Art Critics, 2008.
“Barbados Honors Artist Ras Akyem I Ramsay.” www.nationnews.com. Accessed June 16, 2018.
Lewis, Samella S, David Gall, Joyce Daniel, Omowale Stewart, Akyem, and Woodpecker. “Interviews with Five Bajan Artists.” International Review of African American Art. 7 (1986): 45–55.
National Commission for UNESCO of the Netherlands Antilles. Carib Art: Contemporary Art of the Caribbean. Curaçao: UNESCO, 1993.
National Cultural Foundation (Barbados), and Queen's Park Gallery. The National Cultural Foundation Presents Now at the Queen’s Park Gallery February 16 to March 16, 1992, 1992.
Poupeye, Veerle. Caribbean Art. Thames and Hudson, 1998.
Ramsay, Akyem, Ishi Butcher, Rupert Roopnaraine, and Islington Arts Factory. Caribbean Connection 4: New Paintings by Ras Akyem Ramsay & Ras Ishi Butcher. London: Islington Arts Factory, 2004.
Thompson, Rhonda. “Lifetime Award for Ras Akyem." Nation News. October 13, 2010. Accessed June 16, 2018.
Trotman, A. Ashanti, National Cultural Foundation (Barbados), and Queen's Park Gallery. The National Cultural Foundation Presents Now. St. James, Barbados: National Cultural Foundation, 1992.
Walmsley, Anne, and Stanley Greaves. “RAS AKYEM-i RAMSAY : Moses.” In Art In The Caribbean: An Introduction, 52. London: New Beacon Books, 2010.

External links 

 The UWI Cave Hill Libraries: Sidney Martin Library Art Collection Online.

Year of birth missing (living people)
Living people
Barbadian painters
20th-century painters
21st-century painters
Male painters
20th-century Barbadian male artists
21st-century Barbadian male artists